The Ungna Line was a railway line of the South Manchuria Railway (Mantetsu), connecting Unggi with the important port city of Rason.

History
Seeking to create a shorter route from Japan to Xinjing and Harbin in Manchukuo, the South Manchuria Railway took over control of the Chosen Government Railway's Sangsambong–Unggi Domun Line in October 1933,
 creating the North Chosen Line. Although Unggi was a satisfactory port, a larger one was built at Najin, so Mantetsu built a new line to connect the North Chosen Line to the new port facilities. This line, the  Ungna Line (Yūra Line in Japanese), was opened on 1 November 1935. At the same time, the Najinbudu Line was opened to connect the main railyard at Najin to the wharves at the port.

Following the end of the Pacific War and the partition of Korea, the Ungna Line was taken over by the Korean State Railway, which eventually merged it with several other lines to create the current Hambuk Line between Najin and Cheongjin.

Route

References

Railway lines in Korea
Mantetsu railway lines
Railway lines opened in 1935